Ji County or Jixian may refer to the county-level divisions in China:

 Ji County, Shanxi
 Jizhou District, Tianjin, formerly Ji County
 Jizhou District, Hengshui, Hebei, formerly Ji County
 Weihui, Henan, formerly Ji County

See also
 Ji (disambiguation)
 Jixian (disambiguation)